HD 196885 Ab (also referred to as HD 196885 b) is a Jovian planet with a minimum mass 2.96 times the mass of Jupiter. This planet was discovered on October 23, 2007.

References

External links 
 

Exoplanets discovered in 2007
Giant planets
Delphinus (constellation)
Exoplanets detected by radial velocity
Exoplanets detected by astrometry